This is a list of ski descents in North America which are notable as first descents or otherwise.

It includes a number of ski descents covered in Fifty Classic Ski Descents of North America, a book published by Capitol Peak Publishing in 2010. The book was edited by Chris Davenport, Art Burrows, and Penn Newhard, with significant contributions from mountaineers who skied many of the listed descents.  Contributors included Jimmy Chin, Pete Costain, Lou Dawson, Kristoffer Erickson, Lorne Glick, Greg Hill, Andrew McLean, Hilaree O'Neill, Eric Pehota, Glen Plake, Kevin Quinn, Chic Scott, Lowell Skoog, Ptor Spricenieks, Mark Synnott, and Jon Walsh.

The list of 50 ski descents has become a challenge for some.  Two mountaineers, at least, have worked ahead towards skiing all of these, but have made a point to call it folly, if they were to ignore safety considerations merely to bag another descent on the list.  The corresponding term peak bagging, about quests to ascend all mountains in a defined set, is likewise pejorative.

Canada

Eastern Canada
 Polar Star Couloir, Mount Beluga, Baffin Island

Columbia Mountains/Rockies 
 Mount Robson/Yuh Hai Has Kun, North Face, BC
 Aemmer Couloir, Mount Temple, AB
 Mount Columbia, Southeast Face, AB
 Skyladder, Mount Andromeda, BC
 Comstock Couloir, Mount Dawson, BC
 Seven Steps to Paradise, Youngs Peak, BC
 Rogers/Swiss Peaks, Uber Tour, BC
 Rogers Pass to Bugaboos Traverse, BC

Canada Coast Mountains 
 Combatant Couloir, Mount Combatant
 Mount Currie, Pencil and Central Couloirs
 Joffre Peak, Northwest Face
 Spearhead Traverse, Whistler

United States

Eastern U.S. 
 Tuckerman Ravine, Mount Washington, NH
 Huntington Ravine, Mount Washington, NH

Colorado 

 Landry Line, Pyramid Peak
 North Maroon Peak, North Face
 Cross Couloir, Mount of the Holy Cross
 Wilson Peak, Northeast Face
 Silver Couloir, Buffalo Mountain

Utah 

 Mount Superior, South Face
 Hypodermic Needle, Thunder Peak
 Cold Fusion, Mount Timpanogos
 Mount Tukuhnikivatz, La Sals

Wyoming 

 Ford-Stettner Couloir, Grand Teton
 The Skillet, Mount Moran
 East Face Glacier Route, Middle Teton

Idaho/Montana 

 The Sickle, Horstmann Peak, ID
 Devil's Bedstead, North Face, ID
 Castle Peak, South Face, ID
 North Couloir, McGowan Peak, ID
 Mount Stimson, Southwest Face, MT
 The Patriarch, Glacier Peak, MT

California/Nevada 
 Mount Whitney, Mountaineer's Route, CA
 Stair Steps Couloir, Mount Williamson, CA
 Split Couloir, Split Mountain, CA
 Bloody Couloir, Bloody Mountain, CA
 Mount Shasta, Avalanche Gulch, CA
 Terminal Cancer Couloir, Ruby Mountains, NV

Pacific Northwest 
 Northwest Route, Mount Shuksan, WA
 Watson's Traverse, Mount Baker, WA
 Fuhrer Finger, Mount Rainier, WA
 Newton-Clark Headwall, Mount Hood, OR
 Eldorado Peak, Eldorado Glacier, WA

Alaska 
 University Peak, South Face
 Mira Face, Mount Saint Elias
 Pontoon Peak, Southeast Ridge
 The Sphinx, Southeast Ridge
 The Ramp, Meteorite Mountain
 Messner Couloir, Denali

Mexico
Pico de Orizaba, 3rd tallest mountain in North America, Veracruz/Puebla

See also
List of ski descents of Eight-Thousanders (mountains over 26,000 feet)

References

External links
Fifty Classic Ski Descents of North America, official webpage

2010 non-fiction books
Books about sports
Skiing in North America
Lists of ski descents
Ski descents